Hoarded Assets is a 1918 American silent drama film directed by Paul Scardon and written by Edward J. Montagne and Garfield Thompson.  The film stars Harry T. Morey, Betty Blythe, and George Majeroni.

Cast list

References

1918 films
1918 drama films
American black-and-white films
American silent feature films
Films directed by Paul Scardon
Silent American drama films
Vitagraph Studios films
1910s English-language films
1910s American films